Vaupés is a department of Southeastern Colombia in the jungle covered Amazonic Region.  It is located in the southeast part of the country, bordering Brazil to the east, the department of Amazonas to the south, Kacketah to the west, and Guabari, and Guainia to the north; covering a total area of 54,135 km2. Its capital is the town of Mitu.

History 

During the colonization by the Spanish and first days of the first republic, the territory of Vaupes was part of the Province of Popayán, during the Greater Colombia.  After the independence from Spain between 1821 and 1830 became part of the first version of the Boyacá Department. Between 1831 and 1857 the territory became part of the National Territory of Caquetá to later be part of the Sovereign State of Cauca.  In 1886 became part of the then recently created Cauca Department.

With the expansion of the rubber industry and the industrial revolution, exploration for rubber reached the area bringing colonizers that altered and in some cases extinguished the majority of the indigenous population.

The territory was first made into a territorial division in 1910 and functioned as Commissaries (Comisarias) with the town of Calamar as capital (located in present-day Guaviare) but later moved to the town of Mitú to make an "act of presence" near the border with Brazil.  In 1963 Guainía segregated from the Vaupes and became a commissary. In 1977, Guaviare followed the same path.

The department was created after the Colombian Constitution of 1991 which established it as a Department of Colombia on July 4, 1991.

Economy 

The department's main economic activities feature logging and fishing, with much exportation to neighboring Brazil.

Demographics 
The vast majority of the population consists of indigenous inhabitants. It is the least populated department in the country.

Transportation 
Because of its location in the Amazon jungle, it has no roads connecting it with the rest of the country or internally from settlement to settlement, and commerce and contact with the outside world is achieved through travel along the main rivers and by means of air travel.  Several of the small settlements have airstrips with service to the department's capital, Mitú, and from there with the rest of the country.

Administrative divisions 
Because of its small population and vast extension of land, Vaupes only has three municipalities. Other sections of the department were classified as an especial type of corregiments, which has certain hybrid functions from a municipality and corregimiento.

Municipalities 
 Caruru
 Mitu
 Taraira

Department Corregimients
 Pacoa
 Papunahua
 Yavarateh

Municipal Corregiments
 Acariquara
 Fatima Ville

See also
Barasana-Eduria language
Cubeo language
Tucanoan languages

Notes

References

External links
Territorial-Environmental Information System of Colombian Amazon SIAT-AC website

 
Departments of Colombia
States and territories established in 1991